Al Meshaf is a district in Qatar, located in the municipality of Al Wakrah.

In the 2015 census, it was listed as a district of zone no. 91 which has a population of 165,214 and also includes Al Wukair and Al Thumama. 

It borders Al Wakrah to the east and Al Wukair to the southwest.

Etymology
The district's name has its roots in the Arabic word "shof", which is translated as "to elevate". It acquired this name due to its relatively high elevation when compared to the area surrounding it.

Education
The following schools are located in Al Mashaf:

References

Populated places in Al Wakrah